Point of No Return is the debut album by the jazz group the World Saxophone Quartet released on the Moers Music label in 1977.

The album features a live performance by alto saxophonists Julius Hemphill and Oliver Lake, tenor saxophonist David Murray and baritone saxophonist Hamiett Bluiett. It was recorded at the 6th International New Jazz Festival in Moers in June 1977.

Reception

The AllMusic review by Scott Yanow awarded the album 4 stars, stating: "In future years, World Saxophone Quartet would better temper their free solos with inventive writing, but this early set is pretty self-indulgent."

Writer Gary Giddins commented: "little on... Point of No Return suggested serious absorption in exploring the potential of a renegade sax section (Murray's hurly-burly 'Scared Sheetless' pointedly fills most of the play time), and that little bit was by Hemphill, who always preferred group conception to workaday nightly improvisation."

Todd S. Jenkins called the album "one of their most daunting documents," and described "Sacred Sheetless" as "a series of increasingly abrasive solos." He noted: "perhaps realizing that this approach was a little too overboard for their target audience, the men chose to temper their energy just a bit in future projects."

Track listing
 "Dar el Sudan" (Hemphill) - 2:48  
 "Bajou Scetches" (Bluiett) - 10:13  
 "Point of No Return" (Hemphill) - 10:32  
 "Sacred Sheetless" (Murray) - 24:26  
 "Hymn for the Old Year" (Lake) - 3:38

Personnel
Hamiet Bluiett — baritone saxophone
Julius Hemphill — alto saxophone
Oliver Lake — alto saxophone
David Murray — tenor saxophone

References 

World Saxophone Quartet live albums
1977 live albums
Moers Music live albums